Mimi Chu, born Choo Yit Mei is a Malaysian-born Hong Kong actress and singer. She lived in Singapore before moving to Hong Kong. She has appeared at many events. As an actress, she is a recognised face in Hong Kong and Southeast Asia having appeared in both Hong Kong and Singaporean productions.

Mimi still owns a HDB flat in Singapore and her children are educated in Singapore. Her older brother is the founder and chairman of a listed company in Singapore. She is the sister-in-law of Hong Kong actor and former policeman Joe Ma.

Filmography

Film
 Reunion Dinner (2022)
 A Moment of Happiness (2020)
 A House of Happiness (2018)
 Secrets in the Hot Spring (2018)
 Kidnap Ding Ding Don (2016)
 Magic Barber (2015)
 King of Mahjong (2015)
 Money Game (2015)
 Kiasu (2014)
 Eternal Love (2014)
 Delete My Love (2014)
 Mr. & Mrs. Gambler (2013)
 I Love Hong Kong 2012 (2012)
 Twisted (2011)
 The China's Next Top Princess (2005)
 Dragon Reloaded (2005)
 Sixty Million Dollar Man  (1995)
 Fight Back to School III (1993)
 Justice, My Foot! (1992)

TV Series
 Armed Reaction 2021 (TVB, 2021)
 My Ages Apart (TVB, 2017)
 Ghost of Relativity (TVB, 2015)
 Raising the Bar (TVB, 2015)
 Officer Geomancer (TVB, 2014–2015)
 Come On, Cousin (TVB, 2014)
 The Day of Days (TVB, 2013)
 Coffee Cat Mama (TVB, 2013)
 Inbound Troubles (TVB, 2013)
 Divas in Distress (TVB, 2012)
 The Greatness of a Hero (TVB, 2012)
 Wish and Switch (TVB, 2012)
 Ghetto Justice (TVB, 2011)
 A Tale of 2 Cities (MediaCorp, 2011)
 Only You (TVB, 2011)
 Growing Through Life (TVB, 2010)
 Beauty Knows No Pain (TVB, 2010)
 Gun Metal Grey (TVB, 2010)
 A Bride for a Ride (TVB, 2009)
 When Easterly Showers Fall on the Sunny West (TVB, 2008)
 Word Twisters' Adventures (TVB, 2007)
 The Ultimate Crime Fighter (TVB, 2007)
 Oh Mother! (Mediacorp, 2005)
 Home in Toa Payoh (MediaCorp Channel 8, 2003 - 2004)
 Beautiful Connection (MediaCorp, 2002)
 A Tough Side of a Lady (TVB, 1998)
 Wars of Bribery (TVB, 1996)

References

Living people
Hong Kong television actresses
Malaysian television actresses
Malaysian emigrants to Hong Kong
Malaysian people of Cantonese descent
People from Ipoh
1954 births
People from Perak
Hong Kong film actresses
20th-century Hong Kong actresses
21st-century Hong Kong actresses
Malaysian born Hong Kong artists